Charles Philibert de Lasteyrie (4 November 1759 – 5 November 1849) was a French agronomist, lithographer and philanthropist.

References

1759 births
1849 deaths
People from Brive-la-Gaillarde
French agronomists
French printers
French philanthropists
Charls Philibert